England riots may refer to:

 1715 England riots, across England
 1919 England riots, Liverpool, Cardif and Salford, attacks on Black and minority ethnic (BAME) individuals 
 1981 England riots, mainly in London, Liverpool, Birmingham and Leeds
 1991 England riots, mainly in Oxford, Dudley, Leeds, Newcastle upon Tyne, Birmingham; there was also a major riot this year in Cardiff, Wales
 1992 England riots, mainly in the central and north of England in areas including Blackburn, Burnley and Coventry 
 2001 England riots, mainly in Oldham, Leeds, Bradford and Burnley
 2011 England riots, mainly in London and many other English cities and towns including Birmingham and Wolverhampton

See also
 :Category:Riots and civil disorder in England